In combinatorial mathematics, the Bell polynomials, named in honor of Eric Temple Bell, are used in the study of set partitions. They are related to Stirling and Bell numbers. They also occur in many applications, such as in the Faà di Bruno's formula.

Definitions

Exponential Bell polynomials
The partial or incomplete exponential Bell polynomials are a triangular array of polynomials given by

where the sum is taken over all sequences j1, j2, j3, ..., jn−k+1 of non-negative integers such that these two conditions are satisfied:

 

The sum

is called the nth complete exponential Bell polynomial.

Ordinary Bell polynomials
Likewise, the partial ordinary Bell polynomial is defined by

where the sum runs over all sequences j1, j2, j3, ..., jn−k+1 of non-negative integers such that

The ordinary Bell polynomials can be expressed in the terms of exponential Bell polynomials:

In general, Bell polynomial refers to the exponential Bell polynomial, unless otherwise explicitly stated.

Combinatorial meaning

The exponential Bell polynomial encodes the information related to the ways a set can be partitioned. For example, if we consider a set {A, B, C}, it can be partitioned into two non-empty, non-overlapping subsets, which is also referred to as parts or blocks, in 3 different ways:

{{A}, {B, C}}
{{B}, {A, C}}
{{C}, {B, A}}

Thus, we can encode the information regarding these partitions as

Here, the subscripts of B3,2 tells us that we are considering the partitioning of set with 3 elements into 2 blocks. The subscript of each xi indicates the presence of block with i elements (or block of size i) in a given partition. So here, x2 indicates the presence of a block with two elements. Similarly, x1 indicates the presence of a block with a single element. The exponent of xij indicates that there are j such blocks of size i in a single partition. Here, since both x1 and x2 has exponent 1, it indicates that there is only one such block in a given partition. The coefficient of the monomial indicates how many such partitions there are. For our case, there are 3 partitions of a set with 3 elements into 2 blocks, where in each partition the elements are divided into two blocks of sizes 1 and 2.

Since any set can be divided into a single block in only one way, the above interpretation would mean that Bn,1 = xn. Similarly, since there is only one way that a set with n elements be divided into n singletons, Bn,n = x1n.

As a more complicated example, consider

This tells us that if a set with 6 elements is divided into 2 blocks, then we can have 6 partitions with blocks of size 1 and 5, 15 partitions with blocks of size 4 and 2, and 10 partitions with 2 blocks of size 3.

The sum of the subscripts in a monomial is equal to the total number of elements. Thus, the number of monomials that appear in the partial Bell polynomial is equal to the number of ways the integer n can be expressed as a summation of k positive integers. This is the same as the integer partition of n into k parts. For instance, in the above examples, the integer 3 can be partitioned into two parts as 2+1 only. Thus, there is only one monomial in B3,2. However, the integer 6 can be partitioned into two parts as 5+1, 4+2, and 3+3. Thus, there are three monomials in B6,2.  Indeed, the subscripts of the variables in a monomial are the same as those given by the integer partition, indicating the sizes of the different blocks. The total number of monomials appearing in a complete Bell polynomial Bn is thus equal to the total number of integer partitions of n.

Also the degree of each monomial, which is the sum of the exponents of each variable in the monomial, is equal to the number of blocks the set is divided into. That is, j1 + j2 + ... = k . Thus, given a complete Bell polynomial Bn, we can separate the partial Bell polynomial Bn,k by collecting all those monomials with degree k.

Finally, if we disregard the sizes of the blocks and put all xi = x, then the summation of the coefficients of the partial Bell polynomial Bn,k will give the total number of ways that a set with n elements can be partitioned into k blocks, which is the same as the Stirling numbers of the second kind. Also, the summation of all the coefficients of the complete Bell polynomial Bn will give us the total number of ways a set with n elements can be partitioned into non-overlapping subsets, which is the same as the Bell number.

In general, if the integer n is partitioned into a sum in which "1" appears j1 times, "2" appears j2 times, and so on, then the number of partitions of a set of size n that collapse to that partition of the integer n when the members of the set become indistinguishable is the corresponding coefficient in the polynomial.

Examples

For example, we have

because the ways to partition a set of 6 elements as 2 blocks are

6 ways to partition a set of 6 as 5 + 1,
15 ways to partition a set of 6 as 4 + 2, and
10 ways to partition a set of 6 as 3 + 3.

Similarly,

because the ways to partition a set of 6 elements as 3 blocks are

15 ways to partition a set of 6 as 4 + 1 + 1,
60 ways to partition a set of 6 as 3 + 2 + 1, and
15 ways to partition a set of 6 as 2 + 2 + 2.

Properties

Generating function
The exponential partial Bell polynomials can be defined by the double series expansion of its generating function:

In other words, by what amounts to the same, by the series expansion of the k-th power:

 

Thus, the n-th complete Bell polynomial is given by

Likewise, the ordinary partial Bell polynomial can be defined by the generating function

Or, equivalently, by series expansion of the k-th power:

See also generating function transformations for Bell polynomial generating function expansions of compositions of sequence generating functions and powers, logarithms, and exponentials of a sequence generating function. Each of these formulas is cited in the respective sections of Comtet.

Recurrence relations

The complete Bell polynomials can be recurrently defined as

with the initial value .

The partial Bell polynomials can also be computed efficiently by a recurrence relation:

where

The complete Bell polynomials also satisfy the following recurrence differential formula:

Derivatives

The partial derivatives of the complete Bell polynomials are given by
 

Similarly, the partial derivatives of the partial Bell polynomials are given by
 

If the arguments of the Bell polynomials are one-dimensional functions, the chain rule can be used to obtain

Determinant forms

The complete Bell polynomial can be expressed as determinants:

and

Stirling numbers and Bell numbers

The value of the Bell polynomial Bn,k(x1,x2,...) on the sequence of factorials equals an unsigned Stirling number of the first kind:

The sum of these values gives the value of the complete Bell polynomial on the sequence of factorials:

The value of the Bell polynomial Bn,k(x1,x2,...) on the sequence of ones equals a Stirling number of the second kind:

The sum of these values gives the value of the complete Bell polynomial on the sequence of ones:

which is the nth Bell number.

Inverse relations
If we define

then we have the inverse relationship

Touchard polynomials

Touchard polynomial  can be expressed as the value of the complete Bell polynomial on all arguments being x:

Convolution identity

For sequences xn, yn, n = 1, 2, ..., define a convolution by:

The bounds of summation are 1 and n − 1, not 0 and n .

Let  be the nth term of the sequence

Then

For example, let us compute .  We have

and thus,

Other identities

  which gives the Lah number.
  which gives the idempotent number.
 The complete Bell polynomials satisfy the binomial type relation:

This corrects the omission of the factor  in Comtet's book.

 When ,

 Special cases of partial Bell polynomials:

Examples

The first few complete Bell polynomials are:

Applications

Faà di Bruno's formula

Faà di Bruno's formula may be stated in terms of Bell polynomials as follows:

Similarly, a power-series version of Faà di Bruno's formula may be stated using Bell polynomials as follows.  Suppose

Then

In particular, the complete Bell polynomials appear in the exponential of a formal power series:

which also represents the exponential generating function of the complete Bell polynomials on a fixed sequence of arguments .

Reversion of series

Let two functions f and g be expressed in formal power series as

such that g is the compositional inverse of f defined by g(f(w)) = w or f(g(z)) = z. If f0 = 0 and f1 ≠ 0, then an explicit form of the coefficients of the inverse can be given in term of Bell polynomials as

Asymptotic expansion of Laplace-type integrals
Consider the integral of the form

where (a,b) is a real (finite or infinite) interval, λ is a large positive parameter and the functions f and g are continuous. Let f have a single minimum in [a,b] which occurs at x = a. Assume that as x → a+,

with α > 0, Re(β) > 0; and that the expansion of f can be term wise differentiated. Then, Laplace–Erdelyi theorem states that the asymptotic expansion of the integral I(λ) is given by

where the coefficients cn are expressible in terms of an and bn using partial ordinary Bell polynomials, as given by Campbell–Froman–Walles–Wojdylo formula:

Symmetric polynomials 

The elementary symmetric polynomial  and the power sum symmetric polynomial  can be related to each other using Bell polynomials as:
 
 

These formulae allow one to express the coefficients of monic polynomials in terms of the Bell polynomials of its zeroes. For instance, together with Cayley–Hamilton theorem they lead to expression of the determinant of a n × n square matrix A in terms of the traces of its powers:

Cycle index of symmetric groups

The cycle index of the symmetric group  can be expressed in terms of complete Bell polynomials as follows:

Moments and cumulants

The sum

is the nth raw moment of a probability distribution whose first n cumulants are κ1, ..., κn.  In other words, the nth moment is the nth complete Bell polynomial evaluated at the first n cumulants. Likewise, the nth cumulant can be given in terms of the moments as

Hermite polynomials

Hermite polynomials can be expressed in terms of Bell polynomials as

where xi = 0 for all i > 2; thus allowing for a combinatorial interpretation of the coefficients of the Hermite polynomials. This can be seen by comparing the generating function of the Hermite polynomials

with that of Bell polynomials.

Representation of polynomial sequences of binomial type

For any sequence a1, a2, …, an of scalars, let

Then this polynomial sequence is of binomial type, i.e. it satisfies the binomial identity

Example: For a1 = … = an = 1, the polynomials  represent Touchard polynomials.

More generally, we have this result:

Theorem: All polynomial sequences of binomial type are of this form.

If we define a formal power series

then for all n,

Software

Bell polynomials are implemented in:
 Mathematica as BellY
 Maple as IncompleteBellB
 SageMath as bell_polynomial

See also

 Bell matrix
 Exponential formula

Notes

References

 
  
 
 
  (contains also elementary review of the concept Bell-polynomials)
 
 
 
 
 
 
 
 

Enumerative combinatorics
Polynomials